Muinul Islam (born 1 July 1950) is a Bangladeshi economist and academician. He was awarded Ekushey Padak by the Government of Bangladesh in 2018.

Early life and education
Islam was born in Noapara village, Raozan Upazila in Chittagong District to Obaidul Haque and Shazma Khatun. He completed his master's from the University of Dhaka, second master's from McMaster University in 1976 and Ph.D. from Vanderbilt University in 1981.

Career
Islam is a retired economics professor at the University of Chittagong. He is the former chairperson of Bangladesh Economist Association (BEA) and University Grant Commission professor.

References

Living people
University of Dhaka alumni
McMaster University alumni
Vanderbilt University alumni
Academic staff of the University of Chittagong
Bangladeshi economists
Bangladeshi male writers
Recipients of the Ekushey Padak
1950 births